Zisser is a surname. Notable people with the surname include:

Michael Zisser (born 1966), Austrian footballer and manager
Nela Zisser (born 1992), New Zealand model
Stefan Zisser (born 1980), Italian ice hockey player
Ruti Zisser (born 1974),  Israeli American designer
Yuri Zisser (1960–2020), Belarusian businessman